Corri is a surname. Notable people with the surname include:

Adrienne Corri (1931-2016), Scottish-born actress
Charles Corri ( 1862–1941), English musician, conductor, and arranger
Domenico Corri (1744–1826), Italian composer who migrated to England
Eugene Corri ( 1857−1933), British boxing referee
Fanny Corri-Paltoni (1801-1861), British operatic soprano

See also
Corri English (born 1978), American actress and singer
Corri Wilson (born 1965), Scottish Alba Party politician